Haute couture (French for 'high sewing', 'high dressmaking') is the creation of exclusive custom-fitted high-end fashion design that is constructed by hand from start-to-finish. Beginning in the mid-nineteenth century, Paris became the centre of a growing industry that focused on making outfits from high-quality, expensive, often unusual fabric and sewn with extreme attention to detail and finished by the most experienced and capable of sewers—often using time-consuming, hand-executed techniques. Couture translates literally from French as "dressmaking", sewing, or needlework and is also used as a common abbreviation of haute couture and can often refer to the same thing in spirit. Haute translates literally to "high".

Terminology

The term haute couture originally referred to Englishman Charles Frederick Worth's work, produced in Paris in the mid-19th century. In France, the term haute couture is protected by law and is defined by the Chambre de commerce et d'industrie de Paris based in Paris. The Chambre Syndicale de la Haute Couture is defined as "the regulating commission that determines which fashion houses are eligible to be true haute couture houses". Their rules state that only "those companies mentioned on the list drawn up each year by a commission domiciled at the Ministry for Industry are entitled to avail themselves" of the label haute couture. The Chambre Syndicale de la Couture Parisienne is an association of Parisian couturiers founded in 1868 as an outgrowth of medieval guilds that regulate its members in regard to counterfeiting of styles, dates of openings for collections, number of models presented, relations with press, questions of law and taxes, and promotional activities. Formation of the organization was brought about by Charles Frederick Worth. An affiliated school was organized in 1930 called L'Ecole de la Chambre Syndicale de la Couture. The school helps bring new designers to help the "couture" houses that are still present today. Since 1975, this organization has worked within the Federation Francaise, de couture, du Prêt-à-Porter des Couturiers et des Createurs de Mode.

More rigorous criteria for haute couture were established in 1945. To earn the right to call itself a couture house and to use the term haute couture in its advertising and any other way, members of the Chambre Syndicale de la Haute Couture must follow specific rules:
 design made-to-order for private clients, with one or more fittings;
 have a workshop (atelier) in Paris that employs at least fifteen staff members full-time;
 have at least 20 full-time technical people, in at least one workshop (atelier); and 
 present a collection of at least 50 original designs to the public every fashion season (twice, in January and July of each year), of both day and evening garments.

The term is also used loosely to describe all high-fashion, custom-fitted clothing, whether it is produced in the fashion capitals of New York City, Paris, and Milan. In either case, the term can refer to the fashion houses or fashion designers  that create exclusive and often trend-setting fashions or to the fashions created. The term haute couture has also taken on further popular meanings referring to non-dressmaking activities, such as production of fine art and music.

History in France

Haute couture can be referenced back as early as the 17th century. Rose Bertin, the French fashion designer to Queen Marie Antoinette, can be credited for bringing fashion and haute couture to French culture. Visitors to Paris brought back clothing that was then copied by local dressmakers. Stylish women also ordered dresses in the latest Parisian fashion to serve as models.

As railroads and steamships made European travel easier, it was increasingly common for wealthy women to travel to Paris to shop for clothing and accessories. French fitters and dressmakers were commonly thought to be the best in Europe, and real Parisian garments were considered better than local imitations.

A  is an establishment or person involved in the clothing fashion industry who makes original garments to order for private clients. A couturier may make what is known as haute couture. Such a person usually hires patternmakers and machinists for garment production, and is either employed by exclusive boutiques or is self-employed.

The couturier Charles Frederick Worth is widely considered the father of haute couture as it is known today. Although born in Bourne, Lincolnshire, England, Worth made his mark in the French fashion industry. Revolutionizing how dressmaking had been previously perceived, Worth made it so the dressmaker became the artist of garnishment: a fashion designer. While he created one-of-a-kind designs to please some of his titled or wealthy customers, he is best known for preparing a portfolio of designs that were shown on live models at the House of Worth. Clients selected one model, specified colours and fabrics, and had a duplicate garment tailor-made in Worth's workshop. Worth combined individual tailoring with a standardization more characteristic of the ready-to-wear clothing industry, which was also developing during this period.

Following in Worth's footsteps were Callot Soeurs, Patou, Poiret, Vionnet, Fortuny, Lanvin, Chanel, Mainbocher, Schiaparelli, Balenciaga, and Dior. Some of these fashion houses still exist today, under the leadership of modern designers.

In the 1960s, a group of young protégés who had trained under more senior and established fashion designers including Dior and Balenciaga left these established couture houses and opened their own establishments. The most successful of these young designers were Yves Saint Laurent, Pierre Cardin, André Courrèges, Ted Lapidus, and Emanuel Ungaro. Japanese native and Paris-based Hanae Mori was also successful in establishing her own line.

Lacroix is one of the fashion houses to have been started in the late 20th century. Other new houses have included Jean-Paul Gaultier and Thierry Mugler. Due to the high expenses of producing haute couture collections, Lacroix and Mugler have since ceased their haute couture activities.

For all these fashion houses, custom clothing is no longer the main source of income, often costing much more than it earns through direct sales; it only adds the aura of fashion to their ventures in ready-to-wear clothing and related luxury products such as shoes and perfumes, and licensing ventures that earn greater returns for the company. It is their ready-to-wear collections that are available to a wider audience, adding a splash of glamour and the feel of haute couture to more wardrobes. Fashion houses still create custom clothing for publicity, for example providing items to celebrity events such as the Met Gala.

Members of the Chambre Syndicale de la Haute Couture

Official members  
Adeline André
Alexandre Vauthier
Alexis Mabille
Balmain
Bouchra Jarrar
Chanel
Dior
Franck Sorbier
Giambattista Valli
Givenchy
Jean Paul Gaultier
Julien Fournié
Maison Margiela
Rabih Kayrouz
Schiaparelli
Stéphane Rolland

Correspondent members (foreign)
Atelier Versace
Azzedine Alaïa
Elie Saab
Fendi Couture
Giorgio Armani Privé
Iris Van Herpen
Ulyana Sergeenko
Valentino
Viktor & Rolf

Guest members
Balenciaga
Christopher Josse
Georges Hobeika
Imane Ayissi
Julie de Libran
Rad Hourani
Rahul Mishra
Ralph & Russo
RR331
Ronald van der Kemp
Zuhair Murad
Javi Madrid

Recent guest members have included the fashion houses of Cathy Pill,  and Ma Ke (Wuyong). In the 2008/2009 Fall/Winter Haute Couture week, Emanuel Ungaro showed as an Official Member.

Former members

Fabrics

Silk 
Textiles refer to the fabric or medium being used by designers to create an article of clothing. Silk originates from China where the "Silk worm" was found to live. Asian elite began the use of silk in high fashion since the classical ages. As time went on, silk began to be traded leading to the creation of the "Silk Road" to be formed, which was a boost to China's economy. The value of silk is distinguished by the form of its use, such as it being used as currency. Silk type of fabric is composed of fibers that are produced by the silkworm mainly found only in China. There are various kinds of silks, used by designers, found in the textile world, such as dupioni, China, brocade, Jacquard, and satin silk. These various kinds of silks are often used to produce certain styles of clothing. For example, Chiffon silk is used to create draping due to the fact that this silk is a thinner silk than others. Allowing for easier movement and flow of the fabric, thus creating an easier process for draping.

Wool
Wool is the textile fiber obtained from animals such as sheep, camels, camelids, goats, or other hairy mammals. Wool was first discovered and used mainly for protection against cold weather. Not all types are acceptable or considered "fine" wool. For instance, fine wool is found only within four breeds of sheep, the other fifteen are not considered to be "fine". Dying wool is a delicate procedure due to the fact that wool easily absorbs colour, so it is important to be cautious in order not to ruin the wool. Some of the higher-end wools are alpaca, angora, mohair, cashmere, camel hair, and vicuña wool; each of these wools has a different texture and softness.

References

Bibliography

External links 
 Fédération de la Haute Couture et de la Mode official website